LEY may refer to:

 Lelystad Airport, The Netherlands; IATA airport code: LEY
 Leyland railway station, England; National Rail station code: LEY
 Leyton tube station, England; London Underground station code: LEY

See also
 Ley (disambiguation)